Carrying Place is a community straddling the Quinte West and Prince Edward County border that serves as a gateway to Prince Edward County, Ontario, Canada. Situated northwest of Picton and just south of Trenton, it was named for its location on the portage between the Bay of Quinte and Weller's Bay on Lake Ontario. The Loyalist Parkway passes through the community.

Carrying Place is home to the Department of National Defence's LPH-89 antenna farm attached to CFB Trenton and located along Loyalist Parkway south of Twelve O'clock Point.

History
Before the arrival of Europeans, the local Indigenous people portaged the nine mile stretch of land across the isthmus connecting the Bay of Quinte to Lake Ontario, which gave the place its name.

In 1787, the Chiefs of the Mississaugas and Sir John Johnson, Superintendent of Indian Affairs, negotiated a treaty at the Carrying Place.  The Missisauga agreed to cede land and a river on the isthmus which would facilitate travel across the isthmus separating the Bay of Quinte from Lake Ontario.

Before the Murray Canal opened a passage for ships in 1889, travellers from Kingston to York knew the spot well.  Once a major stagecoach stop on the old Danforth Road (now Loyalist Parkway), Carrying Place is still a milestone for travellers as they cross the canal that made Prince Edward County into an island.

The name Quinte comes from the indigenous Kente, which survives as Fort Kente and the cities of Quinte and Quinte West .

Notable people
 Lilian Leveridge (1879–1953), teacher, writer

References 

Communities in Prince Edward County, Ontario
National Historic Sites in Ontario